Xiong Qu was the sixth viscount of the state of Chu during the early Zhou Dynasty (1046–256 BC) of ancient China.  Like other early Chu rulers, he held the hereditary noble rank of viscount first granted to his ancestor Xiong Yi by King Cheng of Zhou.  Xiong Qu succeeded his father Xiong Yang.

He was succeeded by his son Xiong Kang.  The Records of the Grand Historian (Shiji) says Xiong Kang died early and Xiong Qu was succeeded by Xiong Zhi, but the unearthed Tsinghua Bamboo Slips recorded Xiong Kang as the successor of Xiong Qu.

References

Monarchs of Chu (state)
Year of birth unknown
Year of death unknown